Bill Smeaton (11 December 1928 – 13 May 1989) is a former Australian rules footballer who played with Melbourne in the Victorian Football League (VFL).

Early career

Growing up in the rural city of Stawell, Victoria, in 1946 Smeaton did a pre-season with  where his cousin George Smeaton had made a name for himself as a dependable defender. The young 18 year old wasn't recruited so he moved to Ararat for employment purposes. Smeaton made his Wimmera Football League debut with Ararat in 1948. In 1949 he started kicking goals on a regular basis finishing the year with 84 goals. Melbourne was excited and keen to sign Smeaton before the 1950 Wimmera League season, but had to wait until 1951.  Smeaton had kicked a Wimmera league record of 120 goals for the 1950 season.

VFL career

Melbourne were very optimistic after Smeaton kicked 9 goals is a inter-club match thinking he was possibly as good as John Coleman. Smeaton became a divisive figure when he complained that his teammates were not kicking the ball to his advantage. He tried to leave Melbourne in 1952 only to be talked around. Half a dozen games and it was obvious that he had fallen out of favour with the team and selectors.

Later career

Smeaton left Melbourne and became playing coach of East Ballarat in 1953 in the Ballarat Football League.  In 1954 he was back in his home town of Ararat where he captain-coached for three years.
He signed with Stawell as Captain-coach for three years from 1957 to 1959. 
In 1961 he was talked out of retirement and played for one season with Great Western in the Ararat District Football Association.

Notes

External links 

1928 births
1989 deaths
Australian rules footballers from Victoria (Australia)
Melbourne Football Club players
Ararat Football Club players
Stawell Football Club players